The Halbammer is a river in Bavaria, Germany. It flows into the Ammer west of Saulgrub.

See also
List of rivers of Bavaria

References

Rivers of Bavaria
Ammergau Alps
Rivers of Germany